Ahmadu Bello University is a public university located in the city of Zaria, Kaduna State, northern Nigeria. , it has graduated over 800,000 students.

This is the alphabetical list of some notable alumni.

A
Abdurrahman Abba SheShe, chief medical director Aminu Kano Teaching Hospital
Adamu Adamu, Minister of Education
Ahmed Tijani Mora, Pharmacist, Chairman, Pharmacists Council of Nigeria.
Azubuike Ihejirika, former  Chief of Army Staff
Atiku Abubakar GCON, former vice president, Federal Republic of Nigeria
Ayodele Awojobi, scientist and professor at University of Lagos
Attahiru Jega, professor, former chairman, Independent National Electoral Commission
Abubakar El-Kanemi, Shehu of Borno
Afakriya Gadzama, former director general, Nigerian State Security Service
Andrew Yakubu, former group managing director, Nigerian National Petroleum Corporation.
Ahmed Makarfi, former Kaduna State governor
Aminu Safana, medical doctor, politician
Abdullahi Mustapha, former vice chancellor, Ahmadu Bello University
Adamu Sidi Ali, politician
Abdul Ganiyu Ambali, academic, former vice chancellor, University of Ilorin
Awam Amkpa, playwright, professor of Dramatic Arts
Andrew Jonathan Nok, biochemist, fellow Nigerian Academy of Science
Adetoye Oyetola Sode, engineer, former Military Administrator of Oyo State
Ayo Salami, jurist, and former President of the Nigerian courts of appeals.
Aminu Abdullahi Shagali, politician
Amina Adamu Aliyu High Court Judge
Abdulmumini Hassan Rafindadi, former Chief Medical Director, Ahmadu Bello University Teaching Hospitals, Zaria; former Vice Chancellor, Federal University, Lokoja
Akanbi Oniyangi, Minister of Commerce and Defense during Nigeria's Second Republic
Audu Innocent Ogbeh,  Minister of Agriculture and Rural Development
Abdullahi Umar Ganduje, governor, Kano State
Abubakar Umar Suleiman, Emir of Bade
Abdalla Uba Adamu, professor, vice chancellor, National Open University
Ayo Omidiran, politician
Abdulazeez Ibrahim, politician
Abdullahi Aliyu Sumaila, Administrator and Politician
Adamu Maina Waziri, Fmr. Hon. Minister,  Police Service Commission

B
Bala Achi, historian, educationist
Bukar Abba Ibrahim, former governor, Yobe State
Bashiru Ademola Raji, professor of soil science
Bilkisu Yusuf, journalist, women's rights activist
Bola Shagaya, economist, business magnate.
Boss Gida Mustapha, secretary to the Government of the Federation
Bruce Onobrakpeya, foremost Nigerian artist
Yusuf Barnabas Bala, former Deputy Governor of Kaduna state

C
Cornelius Adebayo, academic, technocrat
Clarence Olafemi, politician, former Acting Governor, Kogi State
Clara Bata Ogunbiyi, jurist, justice of the Supreme Court of Nigeria
Carol King, actress
Charles Ayo, former vice-chancellor, Covenant University

D
Donald Duke, former Cross River state governor
Dahiru Musdapher, former Chief Justice of Nigeria
Danladi Slim Matawal, academic, civil engineer
DIPP, Nigerian singer-songwriter and dancer

E
Elizabeth Ofili, physician, cardiologist
Emmanuel Dangana Ocheja, lawyer, politician
Emmanuel Kucha, academic, vice chancellor, University of Agriculture, Makurdi
Elnathan John, lawyer, novelist

F
Faruk Imam, justice kogi state judiciary
Fatima Batul Mukhtar, vice chancellor, Federal University Dutse
Fateema Mohammed, politician

G
Ghali Umar Na'Abba, former Speaker, House of Representatives
Gani Odutokun, academic, painter
Garba Nadama, former governor of Sokoto State during Nigeria's Second Republic
Garba Ali Mohammed, former Military Administrator of Niger State
Goddy Jedy Agba, former oil marketer, politician

H
Halima Tayo Alao, architect, former Minister of Environment and Housing.
Hadiza Isma El-Rufai, writer
Henrietta Ogan, business administrator
Hadiza Bala Usman, Former Managing Director, Nigerian Port Authotity (NPA)

I
Ibrahim Geidam, governor, Yobe State
Idris Legbo Kutigi, former Chief Justice of Nigeria
Ibrahim Lamorde, former chairman, EFCC
Isa Yuguda, former governor, Bauchi State
Ibrahim Hassan Dankwambo, governor, Gombe State
Ibrahim Geidam, governor, Yobe State
Ibrahim Garba, former vice chancellor Ahmadu Bello University
Ibrahim Zakzaky, Shiite-Islam cleric, founder, Islamic Movement in Nigeria
Ibrahim Shekarau, former governor, Kano state
Ibrahim Shema, former governor, Katsina State
Ibrahim Umar, scientist, former vice chancellor, Bayero University
Ibrahim Bio, politician, former Minister of Sports
Innocent Ujah, professor of obstetrics and gynaecology
Isa Marte Hussaini, professor, fellow, Nigerian Academy of Science
Mustapha Idrissa Timta, former emir of Gwoza
Isaac Fola-Alade, architect
Ibrahim Hussaini Doko, director general of Raw materials Nigeria

J
Jerry Gana, former Information Minister
Jimmy Adegoke, climate scientist, academic
John Obaro, technology entrepreneur, founder, SystemSpecs
James Manager, lawyer, politician
Joshua M. Lidani, lawyer, politician
Jelili Atiku, multimedia artist

K
Kabiru Ibrahim Gaya, former governor, Kano state
Kumai Bayang Akaahs, jurist, justice of the Supreme Court of Nigeria
Kabiru Bala, the current vice chancellor of Ahmadu Bello University

L
Lawal Musa Daura, former director general, Nigerian State Security Service
Lucy Jumeyi Ogbadu, former director, National Biotechnology Development Agency
Lucy Surhyel Newman, banker

M
Mohammed Bello Adoke, former Minister of Justice & Attorney General of the Federation  
Maryam Ciroma, former Minister of Women Affairs 
Mohammed Bello Tukur, Current Executive Secretary Federal Character Commission.
Mansur Mukhtar, former executive director of the World Bank
Mike Omotosho, National President of the Labour Party (Nigeria)
Mohammed Bawa, retired colonel, former military administrator of  Ekiti and Gombe States.
Muhammadu Kudu Abubakar, traditional ruler, Agaie Emirate
Mustapha Akanbi, former head, Independent Corrupt Practices Commission
Musa Datijo Muhammad, justice of the Supreme Court of Nigeria
Muhammad Mustapha Abdallah, head, National Drug Law Enforcement Agency
Mohammed Mana, army officer, former Military  Administrator of Plateau State
Margaret Ladipo, academic, rector, Yaba College of Technology
Maikanti Baru, engineer, 18th Group Managing Director, Nigerian National Petroleum Corporation 
Mohammed Badaru Abubakar, politician, current governor, Jigawa State
Mike Onoja, civil servant, politician
Magaji Muhammed former Federal Minister of Interior, former Federal Minister of Industry and former Nigerian ambassador to the kingdom of Saudi Arabia.
Musa Danladi Abubakar, chief justice of Katsina State
Mohammed Bello Shettima, Director Shesons International Ventures 
Muhammed Ali Pate, Fmr. Hon. Minister, Federal Ministry of Health (State)
Musa Mohammed Sada, Hon. Minister, Federal Ministry of  Mines and Steel

N
Neemat Daud Abdulrahim, current Director of FCT Educational Resource Centre, Abuja, and Chairperson of Public and Community Library Section, African Library and Information Associations and Institutions (AfLIA).
Nuhu Ribadu, former chairman, EFCC
Nnenadi Usman, former finance minister
Namadi Sambo, former Vice President, Federal Republic of Nigeria
Nasir Ahmad el-Rufai, governor, Kaduna State
Nkoyo Toyo, lawyer, former Nigerian ambassador to Ethiopia

O
Oladipo Diya, retired Lt. General,  Nigerian de facto Vice President from 1994 to 1997 
Oyewale Tomori, scientists, university administrator, president, Nigeria Academy of Science
Otaru Salihu Ohize,  politician

P
Patrick Ibrahim Yakowa, former governor Kaduna State

R
Rebecca Ndjoze-Ojo, Namibian politician and educator
Rilwanu Lukman, former Secretary General OPEC, former, Petroleum Minister
Richard Ali, lawyer, writer, publisher
Rachel Bakam, actress, TV presenter at Nigerian Television Authority

S
Sanusi Lamido Sanusi, former governor, Central Bank of Nigeria, former Emir of Kano
Samuel Oboh, architect
Shamsudeen Usman, former Minister of National Planning
Shehu Ladan, former GMD, NNPC
Shettima Mustapha, former Minister of Agriculture, Defence and Interior
Samuel Ioraer Ortom, former Minister of State, Trade and Investments
Sunday Awoniyi, Northern Yoruba leader, former chairman, ACF
Solomon Arase, former IGP, Nigeria Police Force
Simon Ajibola, politician, former senator, Kwara South
Suraj Abdurrahman, architect, army officer
Salamatu Hussaini Suleiman, lawyer, former Minister of Women Affairs and Social Development
Sadiq Daba, actor, former anchor at Nigerian Television Authority
Stephen Oru, former Minister of Niger Delta Affairs
Salisu Abubakar Maikasuwa, politician
Sunday Dare, journalist, media consultant
Suleiman Othman Hunkuyi, politician
Sharon Ikeazor, lawyer
Sadiya Umar Farouq, politician, chieftain of defunct Congress for Progressive Change
Shamsuddeen Tanko Tanko, 
Mining Consultant
Founder/CEO Yataamah Foundation

T
Turai Yar'Adua, former First Lady
Tijjani Muhammad-Bande, career diplomat, president of 74th session, United Nations General Assembly

U
Umaru Musa Yar'Adua, GCFR, former President, Federal Republic of Nigeria
Usman Saidu Nasamu Dakingari, former governor, Kebbi State
Ussif Rashid Sumaila, economist
Umaru Tanko Al-Makura, governor, Nasarawa State
Usman Bayero Nafada, former Deputy Speaker, House of Representatives
Usman Umar Kibiya, former acting head, Nigeria Immigration Service
Abdullahi Umar Ganduje, incumbent Kano state Governor
[[Usman Muhammad Bugaje, Former Reps Member

Y
Yayale Ahmed, former secretary to the Government of the Federation
Yusuf Abubakar Yusuf, Senator Taraba Central
Yusuf Suleiman, former minister of transportation

Z
Zainab Abdulkadir Kure, politician
Zainab Ahmad, current minister of finance

References